George Angus Garrett (August 5, 1888 – September 29, 1971) was an American investment banker and diplomat. In April 1947, he was appointed minister to Ireland; in 1950, he became the first United States Ambassador to Ireland, a position he held until May 1951.

Early life

Garrett was born on August 5, 1888, in La Crosse, Wisconsin.

Education 
He first attended Cornell University, before graduating in 1910 from the University of Chicago.

Career 
During World War I he served in the United States Army. As a civilian he pursued a career as a stockbroker. In 1932, Garrett was a delegate to the Democratic National Convention.

In April 1947, Garrett was appointed minister to Ireland by President Harry S. Truman, and became the last US chief of mission in Ireland with the formal title of Envoy Extraordinary and Minister Plenipotentiary. In 1950, the post was raised to the level of ambassador, and Garrett was again appointed by Truman, becoming the first US chief of mission in Ireland with the formal title of Ambassador Extraordinary and Plenipotentiary.

Although Garrett's relations with Ireland's Taoiseach (prime minister) Éamon de Valera were not unfriendly, he made no secret of his pleasure when de Valera was replaced in 1948 by John A. Costello, for whom Garrett had the greatest admiration, and whom he thought a more reliable friend to the United States.

Death 
Garrett died on September 29, 1971, and was interred at the Washington National Cathedral.

References

External links
Irish President Meets US Ambassador (1950) – via YouTube

1888 births
1971 deaths
People from La Crosse, Wisconsin
Cornell University alumni
University of Chicago alumni
Ambassadors of the United States to Ireland
United States Army soldiers
United States Army personnel of World War I
Military personnel from Wisconsin
Stockbrokers
Wisconsin Democrats
People from Dupont Circle
Burials at Washington National Cathedral